Vicki Randle (born December 11, 1954) is an American singer, multi-instrumentalist (primarily acoustic guitar, bass and percussion) and composer, known as the first permanent female member of The Tonight Show Band, starting with host Jay Leno in 1992.

Career

Randle was born in San Francisco, California. She began her career as a singer-songwriter/guitarist, playing in such venues as the Bla-Bla Cafe, McCabe’s and The Ice House. She also recorded and toured with several women's music artists, such as Cris Williamson,  Ferron,  June Millington and Linda Tillery.

She has recorded and/or toured with  Aretha Franklin, Mavis Staples, George Benson, Lionel Richie, Kenny Loggins, Celine Dion, Herbie Hancock, Wayne Shorter, Branford Marsalis, Jeffrey Osborne, Laura Nyro and Lyle Mays. She appeared in the HBO documentary Mavis!.

Randle became the first female permanent member of the Tonight Show Band with Branford Marsalis, starting in May 1992 and continuing through May 2009. She continued her association with Jay Leno under his five-nights-a-week primetime The Jay Leno Show on NBC as a musician with Kevin Eubanks' renamed "Primetime Band". The show premiered September 14, 2009. She returned to The Tonight Show with Jay Leno with the primetime show's cancellation on February 9, 2010 and continued until May 2010.

In 2006, Randle released her first solo album titled Sleep City: Lullabies for Insomniacs. The album was produced by Bonnie Hayes and included Hayes, Cris Williamson Nina Gerber, Barbara Higbie, Teresa Trull, Linda Tillery, Freddie Washington, Herman Matthews, Stephen Bruton with a track produced by Val Garay.

She is part of the predominantly black all-female rock band Skip The Needle as bassist, percussionist, co-lead singer and composer. The band consists of Randle, Shelley Doty, Kofy Brown and Katie Cash.

In 2022, Randle joined Greg Loiacono's band as percussionist and vocalist, and will be touring on bass with the MC5 led by guitarist Wayne Kramer and featuring singer Brad Brooks, guitarist Stevie Salas and drummer Winston Watson.

Personal life
Randle is openly lesbian. She has residences in Venice Beach and Oakland, California.

References

External links
 
 
 

1954 births
Living people
Guitarists from San Francisco
Lesbian singers
Lesbian songwriters
American lesbian musicians
American rock guitarists
American women drummers
American percussionists
African-American guitarists
African-American women singer-songwriters
African-American drummers
American LGBT singers
American LGBT songwriters
LGBT African Americans
The Tonight Show Band members
Singers from San Francisco
Songwriters from San Francisco
LGBT people from California
Drummers from San Francisco
Women's music
20th-century American drummers
20th-century American guitarists
20th-century American women guitarists
20th-century American LGBT people
21st-century American LGBT people
20th-century African-American women
20th-century African-American musicians
21st-century African-American people
21st-century African-American women
Singer-songwriters from California
American bass guitarists
American acoustic guitarists
American lesbian writers